The Journal of Chemical Education is a monthly peer-reviewed academic journal available in both print and electronic versions. It is published by the Division of Chemical Education of the American Chemical Society and was established in 1924 by Neil Gordon. The journal covers research on chemical education, and its target audience includes instructors of chemistry from middle school through graduate school and some scientists in commerce, industry, and government.

References

External links

 

Chemical education journals
American Chemical Society academic journals
Monthly journals
Publications established in 1924
English-language journals